The 2003–04 season was the inaugural season in the history of the Llanelli Scarlets rugby union team. They competed in the Celtic League, which they won, as well as the Celtic Cup and Heineken Cup, reaching the quarter-finals of both competitions. They played their home matches at Stradey Park along with Llanelli RFC, who had played there since 1879.

Celtic League

Matches

Table

Celtic Cup

Heineken Cup

Pool stage

Knockout stage

References

2003-04
Scarlets
Scarlets